Yussuf Hamis (10 May 1921 – 22 September 1986) was an Israeli Arab politician who served as a member of the Knesset for Mapam between 1955 and 1965.

Biography
Born in Reineh, Hamis attended a high school in Nazareth, before studying at the American University of Beirut.

In 1949 he joined Mapam, and became a member of the secretariat of the Haifa branch, before becoming a member of the party's national central committee and secretariat. He was on the party's list for the July 1955 elections, but failed to win a seat. However he entered the Knesset on 21 September that year as a replacement for the deceased Yitzhak Yitzhaky. He was re-elected in 1959 and 1961, before losing his seat in the 1965 elections.

The following year he joined the Histadrut's actions committee, and in 1977 became a member of the union's central committee. He also served as deputy chairman of its Arab department, was on the board of Beit Berl, and was a member of the Hapoel sports organisation's central committee.

References

External links
 

1921 births
1986 deaths
Place of death missing
American University of Beirut alumni
Arab members of the Knesset
Arab people in Mandatory Palestine
Histadrut
Israeli city councillors
Israeli sports executives and administrators
Israeli trade unionists
Mapam politicians
Members of the 3rd Knesset (1955–1959)
Members of the 4th Knesset (1959–1961)
Members of the 5th Knesset (1961–1965)
People from Reineh
Mandatory Palestine expatriates
Mandatory Palestine expatriates in Lebanon